Kalamazoo Valley Community College is a public community college in Kalamazoo, Michigan. It was established in 1966 by the overwhelming approval of voters in nine local school districts. It enrolls about 10,000 students. Kalamazoo Valley offers certificate programs in more than 20 areas of study and associate degrees in 25 others.

Locations

Currently, Kalamazoo Valley Community College has four campuses:  Texas Township, Arcadia Commons, Groves Campus, and the Bronson Healthy Living Campus.

References

Two-year colleges in the United States
Community colleges in Michigan
Michigan Community College Athletic Association
Education in Kalamazoo, Michigan
Educational institutions established in 1966
Buildings and structures in Kalamazoo, Michigan
1966 establishments in Michigan
NJCAA athletics